Mark Hanerfeld (1944–January 4, 2000) was an American writer and editor in the comic book industry. Starting out in the world of comics fandom, Hanerfeld is most well known for co-creating Abel, the "host" of the DC Comics horror comics anthology House of Secrets, as well as being the model for the character's appearance.

Biography

Early life 
Hanerfeld, a New Yorker, graduated from the High School of Music & Art.

Fandom 
Hanerfeld started out in the world of comics fandom. He took over as editor of the news fanzine The Comic Reader (TCR) in 1968, while also becoming Executive Secretary of the Academy of Comic-Book Fans and Collectors (ACBFC). Doing double-duty was apparently too much for Hanerfeld: by mid-1969 he was having trouble maintaining a consistent publication schedule for TCR and, despite winning a 1969 Alley Award, by early 1970 the 'zine was no longer being published. The ACBFC, meanwhile, went defunct in mid-1969.

Professional comics career

DC Comics 
In 1968, taking advantage of his background in fandom — and his personal relationships with DC Comics leadership — Hanerfeld began writing columns for The Wonderful World of Comics (WWC), a filler text feature that appeared in select DC Comics titles. During the period 1968–1970, Hanerfeld wrote most of the WWC columns, which were probably inspired by Marvel's Bullpen Bulletins; the WWC columns provided insight into various elements of the comics world, from creator biographies, to insider info on company sales and publishing decisions, to the world of comics fanzines and the burgeoning comic convention scene.

In 1969, DC editor Joe Orlando created the design for Abel, based on Hanerfeld:

Hanerfeld and artist Bill Draut then created the first story featuring Abel, in DC Special #4 (July–Sept. 1969); Abel soon became the host of House of Secrets. During the period 1969 to 1974, Hanerfeld also wrote stories for such DC titles as The Spectre, Phantom Stranger, and Justice League of America.

In the summer of 1970, Hanerfeld — on his own dime — attended the Golden State Comic-Con, where he enthusiastically promoted DC's line of titles. Upon his return, he encouraged fellow East Coast comics industry figures to attend future editions of what became the San Diego Comic-Con.

Hanerfeld was officially at DC in the period 1971–1973, serving as an assistant editor under DC vice president Joe Orlando. In that role, he also served as the DC librarian.

Marvel Comics 
From 1974 to 1987, Hanerfeld work on promotional tie-ins for Marvel Comics, producing minicomics featuring Captain America, the Hulk, Spider-Man, and Tarzan advertising Aurora models, Pez, 7-Eleven, and bubble gum.

Throughout the 1980s, he helped coordinate Marvel reprints for the company's Marvel UK line. He left comics after the 1980s.

Personal life and death
Hanerfeld died of heart failure in January 2000 after a period of ill health. He was commemorated at the 2000 Harvey Award ceremony at the Pittsburgh Comicon.

Other appearances 
Hanerfeld appeared as a metafictional character in Batman #237 (December 1971). Written by Dennis O'Neil and illustrated by Neal Adams, the story featured several comics creators appearing and interacting with Batman and Robin at the Rutland Halloween Parade in Rutland, Vermont.

He also appeared in a photograph in Elvira's House of Mystery #4 (June 1986).

The Wonderful World of Comics articles 
 "The Inquiring Fanatic: Whatever Happened to the Guy Who Us'ta Draw The Flash, or, Carmine WHO???" (August 1968) — humorous profile of Carmine Infantino
 "Fan or Reader" (August–September 1968) — how to determine if you are a true comics fan or just an occasional reader. Also includes plug for the Bat Lash story by (Sergio Aragonés and Nick Cardy) in Showcase #76.
 "Fanzine Review; Geek Sneak Peek" (September 1968) — plugs for comics fanzine Star-Studded Comics and Joe Simon's Brother Power the Geek title 
 "The Naming of Names; Con Game" (November 1968) — Bill Finger tells how the names Bruce Wayne, Dick Grayson, and Alan Scott came to be
 "#5: Joe Kubert Is a Grand Old Name!" (October–November 1968) — profile of Joe Kubert; plugs for new titles Angel and the Ape and DC Special.
 "#6: What's in a Fanzine" (November–December 1968) — definitions of various types of comics fanzines; plugs for The Comic Crusader and Fandom Calling.
 "#7: Who Ever Heard of Jay Scott Pike!?!" (January–February 1969) — profile  of Jay Scott Pike and his new character, Dolphin; news about the 1968 edition of Academy Con (which never came to pass)
 "#8: What Makes DC Run?" (January–February 1969) — information about the colorists, letterers, and production people at DC Comics
 "#10: Fandom Picks the Winners; Collector's Item" (February–March 1969) — information about the Alley Awards, some rare DC collectible comics, and letters from readers
 "#11: DC Stars of Stage, Screen, Radio, and Television" (May 1969) — a rundown of various radio, movie serial, film, and television adaptations of DC characters
 "Additions and Corrections" (July–August 1969) — questions and answers about DC's characters and creators
 (written by E. Nelson Bridwell) "Test Your 'Golden Age' I.Q." (November–December 1969) — Golden Age of Comic Books quiz with 20 questions and answers
 "Meet Murphy Anderson!" (December 1969-January 1970) — lengthy profile of Murphy Anderson

See also 
 The Amazing World of DC Comics — successor to The Wonderful World of Comics

References

Citations

Sources

External links 
  — Hanerfeld speaks as the lone representative of DC/National

1944 births
2000 deaths
American comics writers
Comics critics
Comics fandom
The High School of Music & Art alumni